Hollenberg is a name that refers to

Locations

 Hollenberg, Kansas, a city in the U.S.
 Hollenberg, a hamlet in the Netherlands.

People

 George Jacob Hollenberg (1897-1988), phycologist with the standard author abbreviation Hollenb.
 Yael Hollenberg, a French author.